Archiestown is a small village in Moray, Scotland, named in honour of its founder Sir Archibald Grant of Monymusk. It is a typical 18th century planned village with a grid street-plan and spacious square. Originally intended as a weaving centre, it is better known for the nearby distilleries of Cardhu, Knockando, Tamdhu and The Macallan.

Transportation 
Archiestown is served by bus route 366 which currently runs two return journeys to Elgin each week.

References

External links

 Census data

Populated places established in the 18th century
Villages in Moray